Bachelor Creek is a stream in northeastern Callaway County, in the U.S. state of Missouri. It is a tributary of the Loutre River.

Bachelor Creek was named for two bachelors who briefly settled along its course.

See also
List of rivers of Missouri

References

Rivers of Callaway County, Missouri
Rivers of Missouri